Park railway station served the Newton Heath and Philips Park areas of Manchester, England.

Location and early history
The station was located on Briscoe Lane.

The AS&LJ became part of the Lancashire and Yorkshire Railway on 9 July 1847. The London and North Western Railway had running powers over the line, and from the completion of Standedge Tunnel ran express trains between Leeds and Manchester through Park station.

The station was served by local trains between Huddersfield, Stalybridge and Manchester throughout its life, although from 1968 (when many other local stations in the area closed) these mainly called during the weekday peaks.

Later history and closure
Latterly only a handful of trains served the station and usage had declined to the point where it was decided that it was no longer economically viable to keep it open—as a result it closed on 27 May 1995. The overgrown platforms are still visible from passing trains.

References 

Disused railway stations in Manchester
Former Lancashire and Yorkshire Railway stations
Railway stations in Great Britain opened in 1846
Railway stations in Great Britain closed in 1995
1846 establishments in England